Colonel Henry Maurice Drummond-Hay (7 June 1814 – 3 January 1896) was a Scottish naturalist and ornithologist.

He was the son of Vice-Admiral Sir Adam Drummond, K.C.B., of Megginch Castle, Perthshire. In June 1832 he received his commission in the 42nd Royal Highlanders, serving in Ireland, Malta, Corfu, Bermuda, and Halifax, Nova Scotia.

Drummond-Hay was the first president of the British Ornithologists' Union and one of its twenty founders in 1858.

On his marriage to Charlotte Elizabeth Richardson Hay, the heiress of Seggieden, in 1859 he took her family name of Hay. For the last twenty years of his life he devoted himself to the natural history of Perthshire and Tayside, especially the formation of the Perth Museum.

His son, also named Henry Maurice Drummond-Hay (1869–1932), was a naturalist and a planter in British Ceylon (now Sri Lanka). The son is commemorated in the scientific names of two species of snakes, Aspidura drummondhayi and Rhinophis drummondhayi.

References

Further reading
Mullens, William Herbert; Swann, E. Kirke (editors) (1917). A Bibliography of British Ornithology: From the Earliest Times to the End of 1912, Including Biographical Accounts of the Principle Writers and Bibliographies of their Published Works. London: Macmillan and Company Ltd. 711 pp. 1986 facsimile edition by Wheldon & Wesley Ltd. 

Scottish ornithologists
1814 births
1896 deaths
Museum founders
People from Perth and Kinross
42nd Regiment of Foot officers
Scottish naturalists
19th-century British philanthropists
Presidents of the British Ornithologists' Union